This is a list of video games that have been censored or banned by governments of various states in the world. Governments that have banned video games have been criticized for a correlated increase in digital piracy, limiting business opportunities and violating rights.

Afghanistan
During the first reign of the Islamic Emirate government in Afghanistan (1996–2001), Western technology and art was prohibited and this included video games. Between 2001 and 2021, no video games were officially banned in Afghanistan, except for PlayerUnknown's Battlegrounds. In April 2022 Taliban spokesperson Inamullah Samangani confirmed that PlayerUnknown's Battlegrounds had been banned to 'protect younger generations from a bad influence'.

Albania
In 2016, the Albanian government discussed banning the game Five Nights at Freddy's. The ban was enacted later that year. A few days after the ban of the release of Dead Rising 2s release in Albania, retailer Albagame refused to sell the copies over alleged gambling. In early 2019 Edi Rama, the prime minister, threatened to ban the game after a law was passed by the parliament, banning sports betting.

Argentina

Carmageddon is banned in the capital city of Buenos Aires because it depicts people being killed by motor vehicles.

RapeLay is banned because it promotes and supports the use of violence to compel a person to submit to sexual conduct, as well as the exploitation of young people for sexual purposes.

Australia

By Australian law, all media is rated by the Australian Classification Board (ACB), with works potentially receiving MA15+ (Mature Accompanied 15+), R18+ (Restricted 18+), X18+ (Restricted 18+), or even denied at rating (RC, Refused Classification). The ratings are enforced by law, banning retail sales of R18+ and X18+ works to adult consumers and preventing the sale or import of RC works.

Until 2011, video games in Australia could only be rated up to MA15+. At the time, the R18+ classification rating could be given to films, but a video game with content deemed fitting for the R18+ rating would be classed as 'Refused Classification' due to an appropriate classification not being available for the medium. In July and August 2011, all Australian state Attorneys-General agreed to instate an R18+ rating for video games, which would be available by the end of 2011. Many games previously refused classification would now fit into the R18+ rating and, if the publisher chose to pay the reclassification fee, would theoretically be able to sell their game in Australia. The date was later changed to allow the rating to be introduced at the beginning of 2013.

Numerous video games have been banned from Australia due to receiving an RC rating. However, developers may work to address concerns raised by the ACB to gain a rating that allows sale within Australia.

Due to the licensing of the International Age Rating Coalition software for developers to rate their own game, several hundred games have been banned from various app stores as of 2015.

Belgium
In Belgium, games such as Phantasy Star Online 2, FIFA 17, Gears of War 4, Mario Kart Tour, Call of Duty: Mobile and others have been banned due to the usage of loot boxes (which constitute gambling under the country's existing laws) and their equivalents. More are expected to be banned for the same reason.

Brazil
Brazil has banned many video games since 1999, mainly due to depictions of violence and cruelty, making it illegal to distribute and otherwise sell these games. Additionally, the Brazilian advisory rating system requires that all video games be rated by the organization, where unrated video games are banned from being sold in Brazil.

Bully is banned for showing violence and harassment in a school setting. The ban was lifted on 23 June 2016; the game can be acquired in physical and non-physical format through Steam.

Counter-Strike is banned because of violence and a map simulating a favela in 2008. The ban was later lifted and the game is available for sale.

EverQuest is banned because the player is able to go on quests for both good and evil. 

Grand Theft Auto: Episodes from Liberty City was banned in Barueri because it uses music by the Brazilian composer Hamilton da Silva Lourenço without proper permission. It has been resolved and was lifted in 2012.

Mainland China
A very large number of video games are banned in mainland China. Games that depict drugs, sexuality, blood, organized crime or defamation of the Chinese government are almost always banned. Because of the large size of the Chinese video game market, many studios edit the content of their games to conform to the government's standards.

Home gaming consoles were banned in mainland China from June 2000 until 2013. When the ban was lifted, eighth-generation consoles such as the Xbox One and PlayStation 4 were allowed in the country.

As of April 2019, after implementing a new mandatory local rating and approval system, any and all games containing depictions of violence, blood, gambling and imperial history are de facto banned from all accessible platforms in the nation (unless otherwise changed to comply with local standards).

Notable games banned in this region are:

Germany

A video game can be banned in Germany if it is confiscated by court orders because it violates a section of the Strafgesetzbuch (criminal code). Private possession (and thus playing it) and acquisition (such as downloading a demo from the Internet) are still legal, but any dissemination is not. The seller would break the law if a sale took place, not the buyer. However, on 10 December 2002, an "Oberlandesgericht" (higher regional court) in Hamm decided that a single sale of a single copy does not qualify as dissemination. Unlike indexing by the BPjM, which restricts the sale of all content-equal versions. Versions that are confiscated are enumerated in the court order. Being put on the index by the BPjM or, since April 1, 2003, being refused a rating by the USK, does not equal a ban. Rather, it imposes strict trade restrictions on the title. While only very few games have been confiscated, the list of indexed games is very long.

StGB § 86a outlaws the use of symbols of unconstitutional organisations, StGB § 130 Volksverhetzung (agitation of the people), and StGB § 131 instructions for committing crimes. In the official lists, these three sections are always bundled, so any game that contains swastika flags and/or any depiction of Adolf Hitler is listed alongside racist propaganda pieces.

StGB § 131 outlaws representation of excessive violence in media which "describe cruel or otherwise inhuman acts of violence against human or humanoid beings in a manner which expresses a glorification or rendering harmless of such acts of violence or which represents the cruel or inhuman aspects of the event in a manner which injures human dignity".

StGB § 130 and § 131 make it a criminal offence to do the following with corresponding scriptures:

 distribute/sell them
 issue in public, demonstrate or otherwise make them available
 leave them to a person under the age of 18
 produce, buy, deliver, store, offer, announce, praise, import or export them within the meaning of points 1 to 3.

This means that import or purchase and possession for personal use of such games is still legal for persons over 18 years of age.

In the case of video games that contain pornography with minors, where a real or realistic event is depicted, the possession of the video game or working towards possessing it would be illegal under StGB § 184b or §184c. Otherwise, if the work depicts a fictitious event, the distribution of such material is illegal.

Since 2018 there have been a few games where the ban has been lifted.

Guatemala 
Roblox is banned in Guatemala because it can violate the safety of children and adolescents.

India

Fallout 3 is banned in India, with "cultural sensitivities" being cited by Microsoft as the reason.

PUBG Mobile (excluding versions released exclusively in India) is banned because of extreme violence. The move came after a direction from the states of Gujarat and Jammu and Kashmir seeking a ban on the game, as it was claimed to affect the minds of youths. It was banned in the cities of Ahmedabad, Surat, Vadodara, Bhavnagar and Rajkot of Gujarat, as well as all of Jammu and Kashmir. Players have been prosecuted for playing the game. The game was later completely banned due to mishandling of data on 2 September 2020. 

Rules of Survival, Mobile Legends: Bang Bang, Clash of Kings and Free Fire are part of the Indian government's ban on 59 Chinese-owned apps.

Indonesia
Mortal Kombat 11 is banned in Indonesia because of excessive violence and gore as well as depiction of communist symbolism which is strictly banned in the country.

Iran

Iran typically bans any game that contains excessive violence, depicts cruelty, features strong sexual content, nudity, or portrays the Middle East negatively.

1979 Revolution: Black Friday focuses on the Iranian Revolution of 1979 and was banned for presenting "false and distorted information" regarding the revolution, and for being anti-Iranian.

ARMA 3 is banned due to the game's portrayal of a fictional faction, which includes Iran and is an enemy of NATO.

Battlefield 3 is banned because it presented a fictional U.S. invasion on Iran. Even before the ban, many retail stores were removing copies of the game from their shelves.

Clash of Clans is banned because it encourages violence, tribal war and is extensively addictive, as the government states.

Call of Duty: Mobiles services were cancelled by developer Activision for unspecified reasons, but thought to involve United States sanctions against Iran.

Pokémon Go is banned due to security reasons.

Valkyrie Drive: Bhikkhuni is banned for excessively glorifying homosexuality and immoral values via eroge style animation. However, the ban does not extend to digital distributions.

Iraq 
Fortnite and PlayerUnknown's Battlegrounds are banned in Iraq because of negative effects caused by some electronic games on the health, culture, and security of Iraqi society.

Republic of Ireland

The IFCO rarely rates video games and leaves decisions to PEGI and the BBFC. Manhunt 2 was banned for "gross, unrelenting and gratuitous violence", but the ban was later lifted and the game was given a PEGI 18 rating.

Italy
In 2006, following the release of the trailer to the game Rule of Rose, the magazine Panorama ran an article claiming live burials of children at the protagonist's hand. Shortly after, then-mayor of Rome, Walter Veltroni, called for a ban of the game in Italy. The game's European publisher, 505 Games, dismissed these claims, and the game was not banned following Veltroni's comments.

In 2007, following the decision of the governments of the United Kingdom and Ireland, the Minister of Communications Paolo Gentiloni publicly expressed the desire to ban the distribution of Manhunt 2 in Italy, due to the gratuitous violence and excessive cruelty in the video game, but the ban was never put into practice.

Japan

Video games are rarely banned in Japan, and it holds the place as one of the top video game producers in the world. However, for some games, usually western, they may edit or censor their games if they appear offensive to Japan; an example being the Japanese release of Fallout 3. "The Power of the Atom" quest was edited to relieve concerns about atomic detonation in inhabited areas and the Fat Man weapon was renamed to the Nuka Launcher due to its relation to the real historic event. Another example is the Japanese version of Crash Bandicoot 2: Cortex Strikes Back in which a death animation that has Crash squashed into a head and feet was altered due to its resemblance to the Kobe child murders. Japan's Spike removed all references to Kim Jong-il and North Korea in Homefront, as well. Resident Evil 4, Call of Duty: Black Ops, Bulletstorm, Gears of War 3, Grand Theft Auto V, Dead Island, Metal Gear Rising: Revengeance and numerous other violent titles, distributed physically and digitally, were heavily edited for excessive violence, but only on the localization level; the games can still be played if the locale is switched from Japanese to English. The Mortal Kombat series was subsequently banned in Japan, including its newest release, due to heavy amounts of violence . On 13 March 2019, the sales of Judgment had stopped producing future sales in Japan, following Pierre Taki's arrest on suspicion of cocaine use. As a result, Sega had replaced both the voice actor and the character model having been subsequently removed. As of November 2022, video game The Callisto Protocol has been banned in Japan. CERO would not be rating due to the game's violent content and the developer refused to make the necessary changes.

Malaysia

Malaysia tends to ban offensive content such as extreme-impact violence, depictions of cruelty, any content considered anti-Muslim, sexual content and nudity. In August 2008, after the Grand Theft Auto series ban in Thailand (see below), head of a Malaysian consumer rights organization, Muhammad Idris, called for the ban of the entire Grand Theft Auto series and other similarly violent video games such as the Manhunt series and Mortal Kombat. In February 2010, one week after Dante's Inferno was released, the game was banned by the Jabatan Agama Islam (JAIS), a Muslim organisation in Malaysia, for depictions of Judeo-Christian hell iconography which was against Sharia, as well as cruelty and sexuality.

In September 2017, the Malaysian Communications and Multimedia Commission (MCMC) blocked access to the entire Steam store following the discovery of a controversial fighting game involving religious deities, Fight of Gods. The ban was lifted one day later after Valve agreed to block the game in Malaysia.

Mexico
Tom Clancy's Ghost Recon Advanced Warfighter 2 was banned in the state of Chihuahua due to Mexican rebels being depicted as antagonists and stereotyping the cities of Chihuahua City and Ciudad Juárez. However, the game could still be found in shelves in other federal entities.

Nepal
PUBG was banned because of delinquency issues involving youths. Currently, the ban has been lifted.

New Zealand

In New Zealand, games are classified by the country's Office of Film and Literature Classification. If they are dubbed "objectionable" in all cases, they are banned. In this case, the game in question is not only illegal to sell, but also to own, possess, or import. Games are typically banned and classified as "objectionable content" when they contain extreme violence, offensive depictions of cruelty, animal cruelty, sexual content involving minors, or graphic depictions of sexual content, including sexual fetishes that are "revolting or abhorrent" (such as depictions of urination, bestiality, necrophilia, urophilia, coprophilia, and/or incest).

Oman
Roblox is banned in Oman for an unknown reason.

Philippines

In 1981, a presidential decree issued by Ferdinand Marcos outlawed the use and distribution of video game consoles, arcade games and pinball machines, deeming them as a "destructive social enemy" and "to the detriment of the public interest".

While no video games are banned nationwide so far since 1986, at least one title, Defense of the Ancients, has been banned at a barangay in Dasmariñas, Cavite following complaints of delinquency issues, and two murder incidents involving youths in the area resulting from brawls in relation to the game.

Russia
In Russia, games are classified by the "On Countering Extremist Activity" federal law and are included in the "Federal List of Extremist Materials".

Media in the United States and Europe have incorrectly reported that Call of Duty: Modern Warfare 2, which features a storyline in which Russian ultra-nationalists take control of the country and invade the United States, was banned in Russia. Activision called these reports "erroneous". Instead, a censored version of the game was published, omitting the controversial "No Russian" level. This also presumably prevented the game from being released on consoles in Russian, with only a PC version officially available.

Because of the 2022 Russian invasion of Ukraine, few games are being released because many game developers are ceasing operations in Russia.

Saudi Arabia 

Most banned games can be found in many stores due to a lack of government enforcement of bans (often at a substantial price). However, not all major stores will stock banned titles. The Last of Us Part II is banned due to homosexual-related content. Red Dead Redemption 2 was initially banned due to nudity, prostitution, violence, and cruelty. A modified version of the game was launched on May 7, 2020.

Singapore
Singapore has banned games in the past and still occasionally does (including a ban on arcades nationwide from 1983 to the 1990s). With the implementation of the Video Game Classification in 2008 by the Media Development Authority, most games are widely available for purchase to their respective age group, such as those containing full frontal nudity or strong graphic violence under an "M18" rating. Games that were previously banned such as Mass Effect were re-rated either "Age Advisory" or "M18" after the implementation of the classification system.

South Korea

Since 2006, South Korea has only banned video games on rare occasions. Even before this, games were very rarely banned unless that game mentioned elements of the Korean War in order to avoid tensions between the countries North Korea and South Korea. However, Manhunt, Manhunt 2, and Mortal Kombat are still banned because of violence and cruelty. Grand Theft Auto III, Grand Theft Auto: Vice City and Mercenaries: Playground of Destruction were previously banned, but the bans were later lifted.

The Game Rating Board requires that all video games be rated by the organization. Unrated titles are absolutely banned from being sold in the country, and websites selling them can be blocked.

Turkey

No games have officially been banned, but many requests and recommendations were made to ban certain bestseller games featuring violence (such as those against women) since as early as the 2000s, but none took place and the games were left untouched. 

Though on March 10, 2015, the Turkish Ministry of Family and Social Services recommended a ban on Minecraft, specifically after online trolls sent videos (Made to make it appear as if it was featured in the original version of the game) of a modded Minecraft session featuring mods that included violence "not suited for such a game aged for young children" to big media outlets and television channels in Turkey, which then they made news covering the sent reports, and later catching the attention of the ministry and parents, resulting in such a recommendation. 

Minecraft has quite a large player-base in Turkey, and the ministry seeing such a game supposedly featuring violence being played by most of the young people in the country saw it as a big problem. However, the ban never took place, but the investigation stood on halt for sometime without any progression, later being dropped and forgotten.

The case was widely joked about not just across the country but globally by both Turkish and foreign gamers, commentators, online media outlets, and television news too.

Thailand

Additionally, since August 2008, all video game titles of the Grand Theft Auto series have been completely banned in Thailand, because of a case where an 18-year-old Thai player supposedly influenced by Grand Theft Auto killed a taxi driver from Bangkok. The ban, however, does not extend to the digital PC versions of Grand Theft Auto V.

Tropico 5 is yet another banned title. The ruling military junta claims that it could "affect peace and order" within the country.

United Arab Emirates

In the United Arab Emirates, a branch of the government called the National Media Council (NMC) works to control the media and entertainment industry in the country, and they have the authority to issue bans on any specific media products, including video games, to comply with the country's legal and cultural values. Usually, the NMC do not explicitly state their actual consensus for any kind of issued ban on a product, so official reasons behind their bans remain unclear. However, bans issued by the NMC apply only to the sale of those products through local outlets; they do not make private ownership illegal. There are certain exceptions, notably for Spec Ops: The Line (see below). Some banned games may be available and sold on the nation's grey market.

In 2018, the NMC introduced a localised rating system for various media, including video games.

The following  titles are banned from mainstream physical retail. However, unlike Saudi Arabia, most of these games can still be seen on digital storefronts such as the PlayStation Store.

United Kingdom

Games in the UK usually only fail to receive a certification rating (effectively a ban) when they contain real sex scenes and/or gratuitous violence. BBFC age ratings are compulsory and backed by legislation, taking effect 30 July 2012. It is illegal to sell, buy or rent, but not import, a game that has not been classified by an approved age rating organisation in the UK. This only applies to games stored on physical media, not downloadable media.

United States

In the United States, the Entertainment Software Rating Board (ESRB)—a self-regulatory organization, issues ratings for video games and enforces voluntary regulations on how they are marketed and sold. The Supreme Court ruled in Brown v. Entertainment Merchants Association—which challenged a California law restricting the sale of "violent video games" (defined using a variation of the Miller test separate from ratings assigned by bodies such as the ESRB) to minors, insisting that video games were considered a protected form of expression under the First Amendment, meaning that federal or state law cannot be used to regulate their distribution based on content.

However, games can still be recalled as the result of court orders; a nude model featured in The Guy Game sued its developer and publisher over use of her likeness, as she was underage at the time of filming and thus could not personally consent to her depiction. All remaining copies of the game that contained her likeness were recalled from stores. In 2012, a court found that Silicon Knights had plagiarized Epic Games' proprietary Unreal engine, and had used it in Too Human and X-Men: Destiny, along with other unreleased projects. The studio was ordered to recall and destroy all remaining copies, materials, and source code relating to the games.

The ESRB's highest rating, "Adults Only", has been considered a total ban on the mainstream sale of certain games, as most retailers refuse to stock games carrying the rating, and they cannot be published on major video game consoles due to company policies. The release of Thrill Kill, an AO-rated fighting game with extreme violence and strong sexual themes, was outright cancelled by Electronic Arts (who had acquired its developer) due to objections over its content. Following the discovery of an incomplete sex minigame that was not included in the final game but was still present in the game's code and could be accessed using a modification or cheating device, Grand Theft Auto: San Andreas was re-rated Adults Only and recalled by Rockstar Games, in favor of a new revision of the game that omitted the offending content entirely and carried the original Mature rating.

Ukraine
Mortal Kombat 11 is banned in Ukraine due to high-impact blood and gore and depictions of communist symbolism, which is banned per Ukrainian law.

Uzbekistan
Authorities in Uzbekistan banned a number of games over concerns that they could be "used to propagate violence, pornography, threaten security and social and political stability", most notably first-person shooters such as Call of Duty: Black Ops and Doom, horror games like Silent Hill and Resident Evil, Mortal Kombat and even relatively non-violent simulations such as The Sims. The ban was condemned and ridiculed for taking precedence over more important societal issues and a waste of time and effort.

See also
 Video game controversies
 List of regionally censored video games
 List of recalled video games
 List of banned films
 List of books banned by governments
 List of controversial video games

References

Banned computer and video games

Video games
Video games